The 2022 Billie Jean King Cup is the 59th edition of the international women's tennis team's tournament.

Billie Jean King Cup Finals

Date: 8–13 November 2022 
Venue:  Emirates Arena, Glasgow, United Kingdom
Surface: Hard (i)

12 nations take part in the Finals, formerly known as the World Group. The qualification is as follows:
 2 finalists of the previous edition
 1 host nation / 1 wild card
 9 winners of a qualifier round, in April 2022

Qualifying round 

Date: 15–16 April 2022

Eighteen teams were scheduled to play for nine spots for the Finals, in a series decided on a home and away basis.

These eighteen teams originally were:
 10 teams ranked 3rd-12th in the 2020–21 Billie Jean King Cup Finals,
 7 winners of the 2020–21 Billie Jean King Cup play-offs,
 1 loser of the 2020–21 Billie Jean King Cup play-offs, based on rankings

The 9 losing teams from the qualifying round play the play-offs, against the 9 nations that are promoted from the Regional Group I from Americas, Europe/Africa and Asia/Oceania, to see who will contend the 2023 Qualifiers and who stays in the Regional Group I in 2023.

However, prior to the qualifying round both Russia and Belarus were suspended from taking part in international events by the ITF. Australia, the runner-up from 2020, was given the defending champion's right to advance.  They were scheduled to play Slovakia.  Both teams were given byes.  Belgium, scheduled to play Belarus, was also given a bye.

#: Nations Ranking as of 8 November 2021.

Group stage
The final draw was held on 8 July 2022 in Glasgow.

T = Ties, M = Matches, S = Sets

Knockout stage

Billie Jean King Cup play-offs

Date: 11–12 November 2022 

Sixteen teams played for seven spots in the 2023 qualifying round, in series decided on a home and away basis.

These sixteen teams were:
 6 losing teams from Qualifying round.
 7 winning teams from their Group I zone.
 2 later promoted teams from Zonal Group I (Serbia and Mexico) to fill the vacancy of Russia and Belarus.
 1 later promoted team from Zonal Group I (Austria) to fill the vacancy of Great Britain, whose was announced as Final hosts.
Eight winners will advance to the 2023 qualifying round while losers will contest in their respective regional Group I event in 2023.

Seeded teams
  (#2)
  (#10)
  (#13)
  (#16)
  (#18)
  (#19)
  (#20)
  (#21)

Unseeded teams
  (#22)
  (#23)
  (#24)
  (#26)
  (#29)
  (#33)
  (#36)
  (#37)

Ties were announced on June 16.

Americas Zone

Group I 

Venue: Salinas Golf and Tennis Club, Salinas, Ecuador (hard)

Dates: 13–16 April 2022

Participating teams

Pool A

Pool B

Play-offs 

  and  advanced to the Billie Jean King Cup play-offs, while  was later promoted.

Group II 
Venue: Centro Nacional de Tenis Parque del Este, Santo Domingo, Dominican Republic (hard)

Dates: 25–30 July 2022

Participating teams

Pool A

Pool B

Pool C

Pool D

Withdrawn

Inactive teams

Play-offs 

Asia/Oceania Zone

Group I 
Venue: Megasaray Tennis Academy, Antalya, Turkey (clay)

Dates: 12–16 April 2022

Participating teams

Pool A

Promotions/Relegations
  and  advanced to the Billie Jean King Cup play-offs.

Group II 
Venue 1: National Tennis Center, Kuala Lumpur, Malaysia (hard)  Venue 2: Central Stadium Frunze, Dushanbe, Tajikistan (hard)

Dates: 8–13 August 2022 (Kuala Lumpur) / 22–27 August 2022 (Dushanbe)

Participating teams

Kuala Lumpur
Pool A

Pool B

Dushanbe
Pool A

Pool B

Withdrawn

Inactive teams

Play-offs 

Europe/Africa Zone

Group I 
Venue: Megasaray Tennis Academy, Antalya, Turkey (clay)

Dates: 11–16 April 2022

Participating teams

Pool A

Pool B

Play-offs 

Group II 
Venue: Vierumäki, Finland (indoor hard)

Dates: 12–15 April 2022

Participating teams

Pool A

Pool B

Withdrawn

Play-offs 

Group III 
Venue 1: Bellevue Tennis Club, Ulcinj, Montenegro (clay)  Venue 2: Tennis Club Jug, Skopje, North Macedonia (clay)

Dates: 7–11 June 2022 (Ulcinj) / 5–10 July 2022 (Skopje)

Participating teams

Ulcinj
Pool A

Pool B

Pool C

Skopje
Pool A

Pool B

Pool C

Pool D

Withdrawn

Inactive Teams

Play-offs 

Notes

References

External links 
 billiejeankingcup.com

2022
 
2022 in women's tennis